Craig George Baird  (born 22 July 1970) is a New Zealand former racing driver who now is the driving standards observer for the Australian Supercars Championship.

Honours 
In the 2010 New Year Honours, Baird was appointed a Member of the New Zealand Order of Merit, for services to motorsport.

Career results

Racing record

Complete Asia-Pacific Touring Car Championship results
(key) (Races in bold indicate pole position) (Races in italics indicate fastest lap)

Complete British Touring Car Championship results
(key) (Races in bold indicate pole position – 1 point awarded all races) (Races in italics indicate fastest lap) (* signifies that driver lead feature race for at least one lap – 1 point awarded)

Complete Bathurst 1000 results

* Super Touring race

Complete Bathurst 12 Hour results

References

External links 

Speedsport Profile

1970 births
British Touring Car Championship drivers
British Formula 3000 Championship drivers
Living people
Members of the New Zealand Order of Merit
New Zealand racing drivers
Sportspeople from Hamilton, New Zealand
Supercars Championship drivers
Motorsport announcers
V8SuperTourer drivers
24 Hours of Spa drivers
People educated at Hamilton Boys' High School
Australian Endurance Championship drivers
BMW M drivers
Mercedes-AMG Motorsport drivers
Stone Brothers Racing drivers
Dick Johnson Racing drivers
Nürburgring 24 Hours drivers
McLaren Racing drivers
24H Series drivers
Porsche Carrera Cup Germany drivers